Terry "T" Lavitz (April 16, 1956 – October 7, 2010) was an American keyboardist, composer and producer. He is best known for his work with the Dixie Dregs and Jazz Is Dead.

Biography
Born on April 16, 1956, Lavitz grew up in New Jersey. He started taking piano lessons at the age of seven and was offered a scholarship at the Interlochen Arts Academy in Michigan where he studied keyboard and saxophone. After high school he attended University of Miami's School of Music. In his senior year at the UM he was asked to join the Dixie Dregs. He accepted the invitation and played his first show in January 1980. Dregs of the Earth, released in 1980, was the first Dregs album he could be heard on. In 1981 he won the 'Best New Talent' category of Keyboard Magazine's Annual Readers Poll.

The Dregs broke up in January 1983 and T Lavitz, Rod Morgenstein and Andy West went on tour with former Little Feat guitarist/singer Paul Barrere. Extended Play, a five song EP, was released in 1984. The album also featured future Dregs and Steve Morse Band bass player Dave LaRue. In 1985 Lavitz joined the Bluesbusters, a blues-rock quintet also featuring Paul Barrere, guitarist/singer Catfish Hodge, bass player Freebo (Bonnie Raitt) and drummer Larry Zack. They released two albums and toured extensively. His first solo album Storytime was released in 1986. The critically acclaimed Players album with Jeff Berlin, Steve Smith and Scott Henderson was released in 1987.

The Dregs reunited in 1988 to record two songs as a demonstration CD for the Ensoniq company. A short tour followed with Dave LaRue replacing Andy West. Later that year T Lavitz joined the reformed Mother's Finest on tour. Tours with Bill Bruford and the Billy Cobham Trio followed.

In 1991 T Lavitz was invited to join Widespread Panic after playing keyboards on their first album for the revived Capricorn Records label. Lavitz toured with Widespread Panic from April 1991 through the end of that year, but left the band as the Dixie Dregs reunited and re-signed with Capricorn Records in 1992. The re-formed Dixie Dregs shared a bill with Widespread Panic at two events in February 1992 with Lavitz performing with both bands; these were his final two appearances as the keyboardist for Widespread Panic. The Dixie Dregs recorded Bring 'Em Back Alive during a tour in February. Violinist Allen Sloan, who had become an anesthesiologist, was unable to continue touring and was replaced by former Mahavishnu Orchestra violinist Jerry Goodman. That year T Lavitz won the 'Jazz Keyboardist of the Year' category of Keyboard Magazine's Annual Readers Poll. Full Circle, the first Dregs studio album in 12 years, was released in 1994. Another solo album Gossip was recorded before T joined Jefferson Starship in 1996. Jazz Is Dead was formed at the end of 1997 with T Lavitz, Jimmy Herring, Alphonso Johnson and Billy Cobham interpreting the Grateful Dead's music in a jazzy, instrumental vein. Blue Light Rain was recorded during the first tour in 1998. Billy Cobham was replaced by Rod Morgenstein and Jeff Sipe by the time the second album Laughing Water was released.

In 2015, a Jazz Is Dead CD called Grateful Jazz was released (recorded in 2004), five years after T's passing. This CD also features his Dregs bandmate Rod Morgenstein, guitarist Jeff Pevar (who also produced the project), bassist David Livolsi and a number of special guests, including Alphonso Johnson, Bill Evans, Howard Levy, Luis Conte, Bill Holloman and Jerry Goodman.

The Dixie Dregs did a short tour in late August 1999. The band was joined by original members Andy West and Allen Sloan. Lavitz continued touring with Jazz Is Dead and also whenever possible with the Dixie Dregs.

In the first part of the new millennium T Lavitz took part in several projects. Endangered Species, with Jimmy Herring, Richie Hayward and Kenny Gradney was released in 2001, Cosmic Farm, with Rob Wasserman, Craig Erickson and Jeff Sipe, was released in 2005 and Boston T Party, with Dennis Chambers, Jeff Berlin and Dave Fiuczynski, was released in 2006. In the summer of 2006 he began teaching at the Summer Performance Program at the Berklee College of Music, Boston, MA.

Lavitz died on October 7, 2010.

Discography

Solo
1984 Extended Play
1986 Storytime
1987 From The West
1989 And The Bad Habitz
1991 Mood Swing
1996 Gossip
2009 Electric

with Dixie Dregs
1980 Dregs of the Earth
1981 Unsung Heroes
1982 Industry Standard
1988 Off The Record
1989 The Best Of The Dregs – Divided We Stand
1992 Bring 'Em Back Alive
1994 Full Circle
1997 King Biscuit Flower Hour Presents: Dixie Dregs
2000 California Screamin'''

with Jazz Is Dead
1998 Blue Light Rain1999 Laughing Water2001 Great Sky River2015 Grateful Jazzwith The Bluesbusters
1986 Accept No Substitute1987 This Timewith Jefferson Starship
1999 Windows of HeavenProjects
1987 Players – Players1992 The Connection – Inside Out2001 Jimmy Herring, T Lavitz, Richie Hayward, Kenny Gradney – Endangered Species2005 Rob Wasserman, Craig Erickson, T Lavitz, Jeff Sipe – Cosmic Farm2006 Dennis Chambers, Jeff Berlin, Dave Fiuczynski, T Lavitz – Boston T Party2007 T Lavitz, Dave Weckl, John Patitucci, Frank Gambale, Steve Morse, Jerry Goodman – School of the Artsother appearances
1979 University of Miami Concert Jazz Band – Halcyon Days1980 Darryl Rhoades and the HaHaVishnu Orchestra – Burgers From Heaven1981 Projections – Projections1983 Art in America – Art In America1983 Paul Barrere – On My Own Two Feet1984 John Macey – Meltdown1984 Steve Morse Band – The Introduction1984 Paul Barrere – Real Lies1984 Stretch – Stretch1985 Steve Morse Band – Stand Up1985 Nils Lofgren – Flip1985 Jeff Berlin & Vox Humana – Champion1985 Electric Tigers – Electric Tigers1987 Mark O'Connor – Stone From Which The Arch Was Made1987 Col. Bruce Hampton – Arkansas1987 Electric Tigers – Here To Stay1988 Widespread Panic – Space Wrangler1989 Steve Morse – High Tension Wires1990 Lonesome Val – Lonesome Val1991 David Becker Tribune – In Motion1991 Widespread Panic – Widespread Panic1992 Various Artists – Legacy II: A Collection Of Singer Songwriters1992 Kiko – Kiko1992 Dave LaRue – Hub City Kid1992 Bob Mansueto – Like A Stranger1993 Glenn Alexander – Rainbow's Revenge1994 Steve Bailey – Evolution1994 Jeff Richman – The Blue Heart1995 Catfish Hodge – Like A Big Dog Barkin'1995 Greg Koch And The Tone Controls – Strat's Got Your Tongue1995 Gary Tanin – Sublime Nation1996 Kacee Clanton – Seeing Red1997 Pat Benatar – Innamorata1998 Peter Himmelman – Love Thinketh No Evil1998 [Soundtrack] – The Souler Opposite1998 Robbie Krieger – Cinematix1998 Jeff Richman – Sand Dance2000 Soulfarm – Live At Wetlands2000 Jim Stubblefield – Cities Of Gold2000 Inasense – Get Your Shinebox2001 C Lanzbom – From This Day On2002 Andy West With Rama – Rama 12002 Candlewyck – Play2002 Candlewyck – Once Up2003 Bluestrain – Dancing With My Baby2003 Widespread Panic – Panic In The Streets2003 Peter Himmelman – My Best Friend Is A Salamander2003 Roy Vogt – Simplicity2003 Zyg – To The Rescue2005 Steve Yanek – Across The Landscape2007 Woody Moran – Tu-Toned Stranger2008 Teresa Storch – Stream Of Concrete2009 Laura Siersema – Talon of The Blackwater2010 Julien Kasper Band – Trance Groove''

References

External links
T Lavitz on MySpace
Interview from honesttune.com

1956 births
2010 deaths
21st-century American keyboardists
Musicians from New Jersey
American jazz keyboardists
Dixie Dregs members
Widespread Panic members
Interlochen Center for the Arts alumni
Jefferson Starship members
Soulfarm members
Jazz Is Dead members
20th-century American keyboardists